James Hart (1663–1729) was a Scottish minister of the Church of Scotland. He was a staunch objector to the Act of Union 1707. Steele called him the "Hangman of the Gospel" for his fierce condemnation of sinners.

Life

He was born in 1663 the eldest son of James Hart, Provost of Jedburgh. He studied at Edinburgh University graduating MA in 1687.

He was ordained as minister of Ratho Parish Church in 1692. In September 1702 he was translated to the prestigious post as minister of Old Greyfriars in Edinburgh in place of Rev Gilbert Rule. In 1704 Rev William Carstares joined him as "second charge". Carstares was also Principal of Edinburgh University at the time. Hart and Carstares fell out over the Act of Union, with Carstares favouring and Hart opposing the Union. Carstares left Greyfriars in 1707, the year of Union.

In 1714 he was one of the ministers chosen to go to London to congratulate King George I to his ascension to the throne. He was chosen as King's Almoner in Scotland in 1726.

He died in Edinburgh on 10 June 1729. He is buried in Greyfriars Kirkyard. His position at Greyfriars was filled by Rev William Brown (d.1736).

Family
In 1692 he married Margaret Livingston. They had no children.

Secondly in 1701 he married Mary Campbell of Kirkliston with whom he had 13 children, 9 surviving to adulthood:

Publications
Sermons given by Rev James Hart at Ratho 1695 to 1697 (1698)
The Journal of Mr James Hart (1714)

References
 

1663 births
1729 deaths
People from Jedburgh
Alumni of the University of Edinburgh
17th-century Ministers of the Church of Scotland
18th-century Ministers of the Church of Scotland